Gibb is a surname of Scottish origin dating to the sixteenth century. It is a diminutive of "Gilbert".

Notable people with the given name

 Andrew Gibb Maitland (1864–1951), English-born Australian geologist
 Gibb McLaughlin (1884–1960), English film actor
 James Gibb Ross (1819–1888), Canadian merchant and politician
 James Gibb Stuart (1920–2013), British financial author
 Jeffrey Gibb Kennett (born 1948), former Premier of Victoria, Australia

Notable people with the surname

 Alexander Gibb (1872–1958), Scottish civil engineer
 Ali Gibb (born 1976), English footballer
 Andrea Gibb (21st century), Scottish screenwriter and actor
 Andy Gibb (1958–1988), English-born Australian singer and teen idol; younger brother of the Bee Gees
 Barry Gibb (born 1946), English singer, songwriter and producer; oldest of the three brothers who formed the Bee Gees
 Bobbi Gibb (born 1942), American long-distance runner
 Camilla Gibb (born 1968), Canadian writer
 Cynthia Gibb (born 1963), American actress and former model
 Donald Gibb (born 1954), American actor
 Elias John Wilkinson Gibb (1857–1901), Scottish orientalist
 George Gibb (transport administrator) (1850–1925), Scottish transport administrator
 George Gibb (footballer) (1891–1917), Scottish footballer
 Gordon Gibb (21st century), CEO of Flamingo Land Ltd
 Hamilton Alexander Rosskeen Gibb (1895–1971), Scottish scholar of Islam and the Middle East
 Hugh Gibb (1916–1992), English drummer and bandleader, the father of British musicians, Barry, Robin, Maurice and Andy Gibb.
 Jake Gibb (born 1976), American beach volleyball player
 James Gibb (disambiguation), multiple people
 Jo Gibb (born 1976), Scottish theatre actress
 Joel Gibb (born 1977), Canadian artist
 John Gibb (disambiguation), people named John Gibb
 Maurice Gibb (1949–2003), English rock bass guitarist; twin brother of Robin and also a Bee Gees member
 Maurie Gibb (1914–2000), Australian rules footballer
 Moira Gibb (born 1950), British public servant and social worker
 Nick Gibb (born 1960), British politician
 Paul Gibb (1913–1977), English cricketer
 Peter Gibb (1954–2011), Australian criminal and prison escapee
 Robert Gibb (disambiguation), multiple people
 Robert Gibb (1845–1932), Scottish painter
 Robert Gibb (poet) (born 1946), American poet
 Robin Gibb (1949–2012), British singer and songwriter; twin brother of Maurice and also a Bee Gees member
 Russ Gibb (1931–2019), American concert promoter and media personality
 Steve Gibb (born 1973), English guitarist, the son of Barry Gibb
 Thomas Gibb (disambiguation), multiple people
 Walter Gibb (1919–2006), British test pilot
 William Gibb (disambiguation), multiple people

See also
 Gibbs (surname)
 Gibbes (surname)

References